Kevin O'Keeffe (born 9 March 1964) is a former Irish Fianna Fáil politician who served as a Teachta Dála (TD) for the Cork East constituency from 2016 to 2020.

He was a member of Cork County Council from 1997 to 2016.

He is a son of former TD Ned O'Keeffe.

At the general election in February 2020, O'Keefe lost his seat in the Cork East constituency.  His defeat surprised pundits.

References

External links
Kevin O'Keeffe's page on the Fianna Fáil website

1964 births
Living people
Members of the 32nd Dáil
Fianna Fáil TDs
Local councillors in County Cork
Alumni of Cork Institute of Technology